Boyd County is one of the 141 Cadastral divisions of New South Wales. It contains the locality of Coleambally. The Murrumbidgee River is the northern boundary.

Boyd County was named in honour of Benjamin Boyd, entrepreneur (1796-1851).

Parishes within this county
A full list of parishes found within this county; their current LGA and mapping coordinates to the approximate centre of each location is as follows:

References

Counties of New South Wales